Aiolopus thalassinus is a species of grasshopper belonging to the family Acrididae, subfamily Oedipodinae. It is present in many countries of Europe (but not the British Isles or Scandinavia), and in the Afrotropical realm to Asia and the Pacific islands.

The colouration of this species is generally from clear brown to dark brown.  Females have a size of 21–29 mm and males of 15–19 mm.

Subspecies
The Orthoptera Species File lists:
 Aiolopus thalassinus corsicus  Defaut & Jaulin, 2008 (Corsica)
 Aiolopus thalassinus dubius  Willemse (Pacific islands, Australia)
 Aiolopus thalassinus rodericensis  (Butler, 1876) (Aldabra, Rodrigues, Comoros)
 Aiolopus thalassinus tamulus  (Fabricius, 1798) (India, Indo-China, China, Korea, Malesia)
 Aiolopus thalassinus thalassinus  (Fabricius, 1781) (Europe, Africa, central and southern Asia)

Gallery

References

External links

Oedipodinae
Taxa named by Johan Christian Fabricius
Insects described in 1781
Orthoptera of Europe
Insect pests of millets